Richard Wootton may refer to:

 Richard Wootton (cricketer) (1906–1986), Australian cricketer
 Richard Wootton (racehorse trainer) (1867–1946), Australian racehorse trainer